Rizwan Ahmed may refer to:

Riz Ahmed (born 1982), a British actor and rapper
Rizwan Ahmed (civil servant), a senior Pakistani government official
Rizwan Ahmed (cricketer) (born 1978), a Pakistani cricketer who played for the national team and Hyderabad
Rizwan Ahmed (Lahore cricketer), a Pakistani cricketer who played for Lahore